Vipin Kumar Sharma is an Indian actor, editor and filmmaker. He is best known for his acting roles in Taare Zameen Par (2007), Gangs of Wasseypur (2012), Kick (2014), Paatal Lok (2020) and The Family Man (2021).

Early life
Sharma spend his early childhood in a slum in Delhi. Though he was interested into acting from his early days, he got interested in theater, after listening to radio talk of Sanjeev Kumar. He joined a small Punjabi theater group to perform various odd jobs in Delhi, e.g. selling tickets or serving teas.

He is an alumnus of  National School of Drama, New Delhi, India and the Canadian Film Centre in Toronto, Ontario, Canada. He graduated from the National School of Drama, India in 2003, .

Career
Sharma made his acting debut with Doordarshan's television series Bharat Ek Khoj in 1989, followed by his feature film debut in Krishna (1996), he gained attention for his portrayal of Nandakishore Awasthi in Aamir Khan's Taare Zameen Par (2007). He was later nominated for his first ever Screen Award for Best Actor in a Supporting Role for Taare Zameen Par, but eventually lost to his co-star Aamir Khan.

Following the success of Taare Zameen Par, Sharma played the servant Balvant in the horror film 1920 (2008), the title character's landlord in the psychological thriller film Karthik Calling Karthik (2010), Gaindha Singh in the romantic thriller film Saheb, Biwi Aur Gangster (2011), Major Masand in the biographical drama film Paan Singh Tomar (2012), Ehsaan Qureshi in the critically acclaimed crime action film Gangs of Wasseypur (2012), and Dilip in the Indian-Australian-American co-production, Hotel Mumbai (2018). Since 2020, he has starred in the Amazon's series Paatal Lok as DCP Bhagat.

Filmography

Films
 Taare Zameen Par (2007) as Nandkishore Awasthi
 1920 (2008)
 Jannat (2008)
 Karthik Calling Karthik (2010) - landlord
 Yeh Saali Zindagi (2011)
 Saheb Biwi aur Gangster (2011)
 Paan Singh Tomar (2012)
 Luv Shuv Tey Chicken Khurana (2012)
 Gangs of Wasseypur (2012) as Ehsaan Qureshi
 Inkaar (2013)
 Special 26  (2013)
 Raanjhanaa (2013)
 Satyagraha (2013)
 John Day (2013)
 Kirchiyaan (2013) - Bittu (short film)
 Shahid (2013)
 Bullet Raja (2013)
 Kick (2014)
 Akki Te Vikki Te Nikki (2014) (Directorial Debut)
 Main Aur Charles (2015)
 Raman Raghav 2.0 (2016) as Raghavan's father
 The Blueberry Hunt (2016)
 Kaatru Veliyidai (2017) as Dr. Leela's father
 Shaadi Mein Zaroor Aana (2017)
 Baaghi 2 (2018)
 Hotel Mumbai (2018)
 Simmba (2018)
Cabaret (2019) as Police Inspector
 The Accidental Prime Minister (2019)
 Bebaak (2019)
 Gone Kesh (2019) as A.Dasgupta, Enakshi's father
 Moothon (2019) as Orphanage Warden
 Khuda Haafiz (2020)
 Ateet (2020)
 Mastram (web series) (2020)
 Dybbuk (2021)

Television
 Bharat Ek Khoj (1988)
 What the Folks  (2017)
 The Final Call (2019)
 Satyameva Jayate (ZEE5 Originals Bengali) (2019)
 Paatal Lok (2020) as DCP Bhagat
The Family Man (season 2) (2020) as Sambit, aide to PM
Guns & Gulaabs (TBA) Netflix Series

References

External links

https://www.youtube.com/watch?v=RMfatHM9c00

Indian male film actors
Living people
Male actors from New Delhi
Male actors in Hindi cinema
21st-century Indian male actors
1962 births